The Kaituna River is in the Bay of Plenty region of the North Island of New Zealand. It was the subject of a claim concerning the effluent flowing down the river from Lake Rotorua, which resulted in movement to a land treatment system.

The New Zealand Ministry for Culture and Heritage gives a translation of "eat eels" for Kaituna.

The upper section of the Kaituna, also referred to as Okere River, offers some of the best whitewater kayaking and rafting in the world, with the Okere Falls area containing the highest commercially rafted waterfall, in the world.  It is also famous for its trout fishing.

Cultural claim
During the 1970s Lake Rotorua was becoming eutrophic under heavy nutrient loadings, leading the Ministry of Works to propose diverting some sewage flow into the Kaituna River. Local iwi objected however, and filed a claim with the Waitangi Tribunal. Their objections included the insult to other iwi (leading to loss of mana) and destruction of the rivers mauri (life force or essence) which they believed would destroy its ability to sustain aquatic life. The Ministry of Works report however stated that the mauri concept was essentially religious in nature and not scientifically verifiable, while on the other hand diluting the waste would help prevent excess pollution and keep costs at a reasonable level. In Māori culture religion and science are not treated separately as they tend to be in Western culture.

In 1990 however, the Rotorua Land Treatment Scheme saw an upgrade to treatment facilities to remove 80% of nitrogen and phosphorus from the effluent, and land application to reduce eutrophication and satisfy Māori cultural wishes. This has led to better environmental, economic and cultural outcomes for all parties.

Power generation
The upper reaches of the Kaituna river was the site of a small power station which was in operation from 1901 to 1936, the first generating plant built by the New Zealand government. Several proposals for a larger power station have been considered, however the high cost of these projects has meant that none have been built to date.

In 2008 there was a consultation regarding the installation of a new  hydro electric power dam below the river at the end of Trout Pool Road. This would involve the creation of a man made dam and the flooding of some land, destroying a section of river known as "Awesome Gorge" and leaving the section known as "Gnarly Gorge" with a highly reduced flow.  Kayaking and rafting groups and local iwi raised objections. The Department of Conservation granted a concession for the project in December 2007.

Whitewater
The Kaituna River is a world-famous white-water destination. The river has been run regularly by rafting and kayak since 1991. It is used for recreational kayaking, commercial tandem kayaking, rafting and sledging. It is a winter destination for paddlers from the northern hemisphere. The entrance to the upper gorge contains a slalom course that has been used by international teams for their off-season training prior to world championships and Olympic competition. The upper gorge contains a number of play features, including the famous "bottom hole". The entire river has been run. The temperate rainforest, warm water, and its unusual character means the river is well known in international whitewater kayak videos.

Notable waterfalls in the upper gorge are Okere Falls, Tutea Falls (the highest commercially rafted waterfall), and Trout Pool Falls, all of which are accessible via the Okere Falls track.

References

Treaty of Waitangi
Rivers of the Bay of Plenty Region
Rivers of New Zealand